Surigao del Sur (Surigaonon: Probinsya nan Surigao del Sur;), officially the Province of Surigao del Sur, is a province in the Philippines located in the Caraga region in Mindanao. Its capital is Tandag City. Surigao del Sur is situated at the eastern coast of Mindanao and faces the Philippine Sea to the east.

Etymology

There are two hypotheses on the original meaning of "Surigao" among linguists, depending on the original root word.

Another possibility is that it is derived from Visayan  or suyogao, meaning "water current". From suyog (also sulog or ), "current"; cf. Sinulog, Sulu, and Tausug (Suluk).

History

In precolonial times, the region of Surigao was inhabited by the Visayan Surigaonon people in the coastal areas, as well as Lumad groups in the interiors like the Mandaya, Mansaka, Mamanwa and Manobo.

During the Spanish Occupation in 1860, six military districts were created in Mindanao, with Surigao and Agusan forming the "East District". In 1870, the district was renamed to "Distrito de Surigao". In 1901, Distrito de Surigao became chartered province. Agusan became an independent province in 1907 during the American era, when it was separated from Surigao.

Independent province
Surigao del Sur was created as the 56th Philippine province on June 19, 1960, through Republic Act 2786, separated from its mother province, Surigao, on September 18, 1960.

At the time of its inception, it was classified as 4th Class province with an annual income of over 300,000.00. Seven years later, because of rapid increase of revenue collection particularly from the logging ventures, it has been reclassified as Ist Class B and in 1980 as Ist Class A with an estimated annual income of around 13,000,000. It has been reclassified as 2nd Class with a revenue adding up to 315,888,300.63.

Recaredo B. Castillo was the appointed first governor and subsequently elected governor while Vicente L. Pimentel was the first elected congressman.

The province was formed with 13 municipalities. Six more were added, raising the number to 19 with Tandag as the capital. Two of its municipalities have been elevated to cities; the first was Bislig City. In 2007, Tandag was granted cityhood but it was nullified via a controversial decision by the Supreme Court a year later. In 2009, Tandag got back its city status after the court reversed its own ruling on December 22, 2009.

Geography

Surigao del Sur is located along the northeastern coast of Mindanao facing the Philippine Sea between 125°40' to 126°20' east longitudes and 7°55' and 9°20' north latitudes. It is bounded on the northwest by the province of Surigao del Norte, on the southeast by Davao Oriental, on the west and southwest by Agusan del Norte and Agusan del Sur.

Situated west is the Diwata Mountain Range, isolating the province from the rest of Mindanao. To the east lies the Philippine Sea. The Mindanao Deep, one of the deepest trenches in the world, is situated a few kilometers east of the coastline.

Land area

The land area of the province is  representing 27.75 percent of the total land area of Caraga Administrative Region and about 5.14 percent and 1.74 percent of the total land area of Mindanao and Philippines, respectively. The province is elongated in shape, extending from the northeastern portion at Carrascal to the southernmost municipality of Lingig.

Of the  land, only  or 32.22 percent are classified as alienable and disposable (A and D) while  or 67.78 percent are forest land.

As of today, the province still has vast areas of remaining old growth and mossy forest.

Climate
The province falls under Type II climate of the Philippines, characterized by rainfall distributed throughout the year, although there is a distinct rainy season which begins from the month of November and ends in March. However, the climatic behavior of the province for the past few years has shown variations wherein the onset of the rainy seasons no longer occurs on the usual time. Months with low rainfall are from July to October with September as the driest month. Wet months are from November to June with January as the wettest month.

Surigao del Sur is one of the top 20 most vulnerable provinces to climate change in the Philippines.

Administrative divisions
Surigao del Sur comprises 17 municipalities and two cities, further subdivided into 309 barangays. There are two congressional districts encompassing all cities and towns.

Demographics

The province is home to the Kamayo and Agusan people. Their dances are showcased in the local festival, "Sirong Festival", held especially during the town fiesta of Cantilan. The Sirong Festival depicts the early Christianization of the early Cantilan inhabitants where the natives tried to defend their land against Visayan invaders.

The indigenous people of the province were largely Christianized during the early times of the Spanish conquest.

Languages
The Surigaonon and Tandaganon languages are spoken in most parts of Surigao del Sur (except in Bislig and the towns of Barobo, Hinatuan, Lingig and Tagbina, where most of the inhabitants speak Cebuano and their native Kamayo, a different language but one distantly related to Surigaonon, is spoken by the rest of the population), with the Cantilangnon dialect, a northern variety of Surigaonon that is very much similar to the dialect of Surigaonon as spoken in Surigao del Norte, being spoken mostly in the five northern municipalities of the province, namely Carrascal, Cantilan, Madrid, Carmen and Lanuza (or the municipal cluster called Carcanmadcarlan); these municipalities were once under a single Municipality of Cantilan before December 10, 1918.

Tagalog and English are also widely spoken throughout the province and used as the primary languages of education, business, and administration.

Economy

Surigao del Sur is one of the suppliers of rice, bananas and other tropical fruits. Copper, chromite and silver are also found here. Marine and aquaculture are abundant in the province, being primary livelihoods of the inhabitants as the province is well known for producing seafood and sea by-products.

Mineral resources
Surigao del Sur is endowed with metallic minerals such as copper, gold, chromite, cobalt, nickel and lead zinc, as well as non-metallic (limestone, coal and feldspar, clay diatomite/bentomite and coarse/fine aggregates). There are small and large scale mining activities in the province. Corporations operating in a large scale are the Marc Ventures Mining Development Corporation at Carrascal and Cantilan, operating in an area of  within the Diwata Mountain Range. Small scale mining activities are found in the municipalities of Barobo, Carmen and San Miguel.

Tourism
Bislig's main tourist attraction is the Tinuy-an Falls, known as the little "Niagara Falls of the Philippines". Its unique natural formation once appeared in the International Travel Magazine. It is also known as the widest waterfall in the Philippines.

Surfing in Surigao del Sur is widely known and has been one of the local tourist attractions. This extreme sport is often practiced in Cantilan and Lanuza. Skimboarding is also found in several municipalities, attracting tourists.

See also
 Surigao del Norte
 Dinagat Islands

References

External links

 
 
 Local Governance Performance Management System 
 Surigao del Sur provincial profile at Philippine Provincial Profiles

 
Provinces of the Philippines
Provinces of Caraga
States and territories established in 1960
1960 establishments in the Philippines